Rank comparison chart of navies of Asian states.

Officers

Warrant Officers

See also 
 Comparative navy enlisted ranks of Asia

Notes

References

Asia
Military comparisons